Adelmar may refer to:
Adelmar Faria Coimbra-Filho (1924–2016), Brazilian biologist and primatologist
Adelmar Tavares (1888–1963), Brazilian lawyer
Javier Adelmar Zanetti (born 1973), Argentine footballer
Estádio Adelmar da Costa Carvalho, a football stadium situated in Recife, Pernambuco, Brazil